Bradley Creek may refer to:

Bradley Creek (California)
Bradley Creek (Iowa)
Bradley Creek (Middle Fork Flathead River tributary), a stream in Montana
Bradley Creek (Banister River tributary), a stream in Halifax County, Virginia
Bradley Creek (Wisconsin)